Xi Cassiopeiae (ξ Cassiopeiae) is a blue-white hued binary star system in the northern constellation of Cassiopeia. It has an apparent visual magnitude of +4.81 and thus is faintly visible to the naked eye. Based upon an annual parallax shift of 2.28 mas as seen from Earth, this system is located roughly 1,400 light years from the Sun. At that distance, the visual magnitude of the system is diminished by an extinction factor of 0.20 due to interstellar dust. It is advancing in the general direction of the Sun with a radial velocity of roughly −10.6 km/s.

This is a single-lined spectroscopic binary star system with an orbital period of 940.2 days and an eccentricity of 0.4. The visible component has the spectrum of a B-type main-sequence star with a stellar classification of B2.5 V. It has an estimated 10.1 times the mass of the Sun and around 4.5 times the Sun's radius. At the age of 19 million years, it has a high rate of rotation with a projected rotational velocity of about 139 km/s. The star is radiating 2,873 times the Sun's luminosity from its photosphere at an effective temperature of around 15,585 K.

References

B-type main-sequence stars
Spectroscopic binaries
Cassiopeia (constellation)
Cassiopeiae, Xi
Durchmusterung objects
Cassiopeiae, 19
003901
003300
0179